Yermolkino is a rural locality (a selo) in Kalininsky Selsoviet, Bizhbulyaksky District, Bashkortostan, Russia. The population was 354 as of 2010. There are 3 streets.

Geography 
Yermolkino is located 20 km northeast of Bizhbulyak (the district's administrative centre) by road. Petrovka is the nearest rural locality.

References 

Rural localities in Bizhbulyaksky District